Betws Bach farmhouse if a Grade II listed building in the community of Llanystumdwy. The main part of the farmhouse was built in C16 (around 1649)  and still retains much charm, historic interest and character.  The main part of this imposing farmhouse is three storeys and has three inglenook fireplaces. To the rear and north gable an addition was built in the eighteenth century.  The house has a wealth of oak beams and exposed stonework.

References

Llanystumdwy
Grade II listed buildings in Gwynedd